San Giovanni la Punta (Sicilian: San Giuvanni la Punta) is a comune (municipality) in the Metropolitan City of Catania in the Italian region Sicily, located about  southeast of Palermo and about  northeast of Catania.

San Giovanni la Punta borders the following municipalities: Aci Bonaccorsi, Pedara, San Gregorio di Catania, Sant'Agata li Battiati, Trecastagni, Tremestieri Etneo, Valverde, Viagrande.

Famous people
Gabriele Allegra, Blessed (1907–76)
Lucia Mangano, Venerable (1896–1946)
Carmen Consoli

References

Cities and towns in Sicily